David Drew  (12 March 1938 – 16 October 2015) was an English ballet dancer and Principal Character Artist of The Royal Ballet.

Biography
Drew was born in London in 1938. He received his early training in dance at the Westbury School of Dancing in Bristol, before entering professional ballet training at the Royal Ballet School.  He was a dancer with The Royal Ballet for the entire duration of his career: he joined the company in 1955 and was promoted to Soloist in 1961 and to Principal in 1974. He retired from The Royal Ballet as a Principal dancer following the 2002/2003 season, but continued to dance with the company as a Principal Character Artist and, in recognition of his long service to the company, he was also awarded the honorary title of Guest Artist. He contributed significantly to the improvement of the working conditions of the dancers notably during the redevelopment of the Royal Opera House between 1997 and 1999. He was the union representative of The Royal Ballet for 40 years. He retired as a dancer in 2012. Drew was a teacher of pas de deux at the Royal Ballet School, the founder President of the Ballet Association, and in 2006, he was awarded the MBE for services to dance. He was married to actress June Ritchie.

He died on 16 October 2015.

Repertoire

Created roles
 The Captain in Different Drummer, choreographed by Sir Kenneth MacMillan
 Colonel Middleton in Mayerling, choreographed by Sir Kenneth MacMillan
 Demetrius in The Dream, choreographed by Sir Frederick Ashton
 The Gaoler in L'histoire de Manon, choreographed by Sir Kenneth MacMillan
 Giles in The Crucible, choreography by William Tuckett
 Grand Master in Rituals, choreographed by Sir Kenneth MacMillan
 Max Merz in Isadora, choreographed by Sir Kenneth MacMillan

Other roles
 Anastasia – The Husband
 La Bayadère – The Rajah and The Brahmin
 Cinderella – Ugly Sister and Cinderella's Father
 Cyrano – de Guiche
 Don Quixote
 Enigma Variations – Nevinson
 The Firebird – Kostcheï
 Giselle – Hilarion and the Duke of Courtland
 Job – Satan
 La fille mal gardée – Thomas
 Manon – Monsieur G.M.
 Marguerite and Armand – The Father
 Mayerling – Emperor Franz-Josef
 A Month in The Country – Yslaev
 Petrushka – The Conjurer
 The Prince of the Pagodas – The Emperor's Chancellor
 Romeo and Juliet – Friar Laurence, Mercutio, Lord Capulet and Tybalt
 The Sleeping Beauty – Catalabutte and The King
 Swan Lake – Baron von Rothbart
 The Tales of Beatrix Potter – Mrs Pettitoes
 Winter Dreams – Doctor Chetbutkin

References

People educated at the Royal Ballet School
Principal dancers of The Royal Ballet
English male ballet dancers
Members of the Order of the British Empire
Dancers from London
People educated at Bristol Grammar School
1938 births
2015 deaths